Serri may refer to:

People
 Bracha Serri (1940–2013), Israeli poet
 Eddy Serri (born 1974), Italian cyclist
 Rino Serri (1933–2006), Italian politician
 Serri (singer), South Korean singer and songwriter

Places
 Serri, Sardinia, Italy

Other
 Serri, one of the dialects of the Lule Sami language spoken in Norway and Sweden